Butterkuchen or Zuckerkuchen is a simple German butter cake baked on a tray. Flakes of butter are distributed on the dough which, after baking, form the characteristic holes. The whole cake is sprinkled with sugar or streusel. After further kneading the Butterkuchen is baked. As a variation the dough can be sprinkled with roasted almond flakes.

Butterkuchen is a favourite element of Westphalian and North German coffee tables. It is also served at weddings and funerals and, as a result, is sometimes called  Freud-und-Leid-Kuchen ("joy and sorrow cake") or Beerdigungskuchen ("funeral cake").

A regional variation is to sprinkle the Butterkuchen with a sugar-cinnamon mixture rather than with sugar alone. This is very similar to Moravian Sugar Cake.

In Germany in the trade, at least 30 parts butter, clarified butter or butterfat must be used to 100 parts of flour.

See also
 Kouign-amann
 List of butter dishes
 List of cakes

Sources

 IREKS-GmbH: IREKS-ABC der Bäckerei, Eigenverlag Kulmbach

External links
Deutscher Butterkuchen - German Buttercake recipe
An Old Custom, Funeral Cakes - NY Times

Cakes
Foods featuring butter
North German cuisine
German cakes